Michael James Hart (born 19 June 1960) is an Australian Liberal National politician who is the member of the Legislative Assembly of Queensland for Burleigh, having defeated Christine Smith at the 2012 state election then being re-elected at the 31 January election in 2015.

Michael was born in Bega on 19 June 1960. Before his entry into the Queensland parliament he was the company director and CEO of Mastercut Technologies. He is a qualified aircraft maintenance engineer. He is a longtime follower and supporter of Surf Life Saving Queensland, having been president of the Pacific Life Saving Club in his electorate in 2011–2012 and subsequently the patron of the South Coast branch of SLSQ.

Michael moved to the Gold Coast in 1986 with his family, including wife Sally and three children Tim, Hayden and Jessica.

In his maiden speech in government he emphasized his belief in small government with minimal regulation, stating "I believe good government needs to ensure the population is secure from interference from the actions of others. If a government just does that one thing, I believe it succeeds."

He was appointed Shadow Minister for Energy, Biofuels and Water Supply in May 2016 and served on the Infrastructure Planning and Natural Resources parliamentary committee in 2012 and was Deputy Chair of the committee in 2015-2016 (June).

He was the Shadow Minister for Housing and Public Works, Shadow Minister for Energy and Shadow Minister for Innovation and Digital Technology until November 2020.

References

Liberal National Party of Queensland politicians
1960 births
Living people
Members of the Queensland Legislative Assembly
People from the Gold Coast, Queensland
21st-century Australian politicians